Manor is a Metropolitan Borough of Sefton ward in the Sefton Central Parliamentary constituency that covers the localities of Thornton, Little Crosby, and Hightown. The population of the ward taken at the 2011 census was 12,497.

Councillors

Election results

Elections of the 2010s

References

Wards of the Metropolitan Borough of Sefton